Whizzer, originally Willard's Whizzer, is an Anton Schwarzkopf Speedracer roller coaster located at Six Flags Great America in Gurnee, Illinois. It was one of two identical roller coasters built for the Marriott Corporation for each of their “Great America” parks at their debut in 1976, with an identical version of the Whizzer at California's Great America. Marriott continued to operate both parks until selling them in 1984. Manufactured by Anton Schwarzkopf of Germany, the two rides were the last “Speedracer” models ever built. The California Whizzer was dismantled in 1988 while the Illinois Whizzer remains in operation, as one of only two Speedracers still in existence worldwide (the other operating as Broca (formerly known as Zambezi Zinger) at Parque Nacional Del Café in Montenegro, Colombia).

Gurnee Whizzer
Six Flags Great America's Whizzer marked its 40th anniversary on May 29, 2016. The ride nearly was closed in August 2002, fueled by increasing maintenance costs, to make way for Superman: Ultimate Flight. However, due to public backlash and outcry, the park reversed their decision at the last minute and instead demolished Shockwave, putting Superman: Ultimate Flight on its plot of land in Orleans Place.

Santa Clara Whizzer
After Marriott sold California's Great America to the city of Santa Clara under management of the Kings Entertainment Company, the Whizzer continued to operate until it was subsequently demolished in 1988. A few cement footers still remain, outlining the spot where the ill-fated Whizzer once stood.

Incidents and accidents 
From the start, both Whizzers suffered from problems with the braking system that would sometimes allow the trains to collide in the station. Unfortunately, no immediate solution was put forth to remedy this problem. In one four-year period, from 1976 to 1979, there were at least 11 recorded instances of station collisions on the version in Santa Clara, resulting in an unknown number of injuries. There were also two station collisions on the version in Gurnee - both of which occurred less than a month apart on July 24 and August 18, 1976. A total of 31 riders were injured in the Gurnee collisions. Then on March 29, 1980, a 14-year-old boy was killed and eight others injured after two trains collided at the station on the Santa Clara Whizzer. Following the accident, both rides underwent several changes. Seatbelts were added, the braking system was modified and the number of trains that could be run at once was reduced from five to three. Willard’s name was also dropped, leaving the ride’s name as simply "Whizzer." Marriott never reported the potential safety hazard to the Consumer Product Safety Commission, which led to a 1981 civil penalty amounting to $70,000.

Awards
The Whizzer has been recognized as an ACE Coaster Landmark and received a plaque on August 10, 2012.

Notes

External links
 History of the Gurnee and Santa Clara Whizzer roller coasters
 Photos of Dismantled Whizzer in California.
 List of Anton Schwarzkopf Speedracer models
 Anton Schwarzkopf Speedracer catalogue overview
 Additional Gurnee Whizzer photos and information
 Additional Santa Clara Whizzer photos and information
 Video of the Whizzer in action

Former roller coasters in California
Roller coasters in Illinois
Roller coasters operated by Six Flags
Six Flags Great America
California's Great America
1976 establishments in California
1976 establishments in Illinois
1988 disestablishments in California